Route 354 is a collector road in the Canadian province of Nova Scotia.

It is located in the central part of the province and connects Middle Sackville at Highway 101 with Noel at Route 215. From Middle Sackville to Beaver Bank it runs on the "Beaver Bank Road". Speed limits vary from 50km/h for a short section in Lower Sackville to 80km/h for the majority of the route past Beaver Bank.

Communities
Middle Sackville
Beaverbank
Middle Beaverbank
North Beaverbank
Beaver Bank Villa
Upper Rawdon
Gore
Kennetcook
Noel Road
North Noel Road
Gormanville
Noel

See also
List of Nova Scotia provincial highways

References

Nova Scotia provincial highways
Roads in Halifax, Nova Scotia
Roads in Hants County, Nova Scotia